Royal Bavarian Jagdstaffel 16 was a "hunting group" (i.e., fighter squadron) of the Luftstreitkräfte, the air arm of the Imperial German Army during World War I.

History
Royal Bavarian Jagdstaffel 16 was founded from two ad hoc predecessor units — a Bavarian reconnaissance unit, Flieger Abteilung 9, and Kampfeinsitzer-Kommando Ensisheim. These two units were amalgamated on 16 October 1916, while posted in Armee-Abteilung B Sector. Oberleutnant Otto Deßloch commanded this nascent squadron the few days it took to be designated Jagdstaffel 16, on 1 November. By the time it disbanded just two years later, it had established its credentials as a balloon buster squadron, with an even two dozen enemy observation balloons destroyed, as well as 58 victories over enemy aircraft.

Commanding officers (Staffelführer)
 Paul Kremer: 1 November 1916 – 8 July 1917
 Heinrich Geigl: 18 July 1917 – 20 August 1917
 Robert Dycke: 20 August 1917 – 1 December 1917
 Heinrich Geigl: 1 December 1917 – 4 April 1918
 Friedrich Ritter von Röth: 8 April 1918 – 9 September 1918
 Rudolf Eck: 9 September 1918 – October 1918
 Friedrich Ritter von Röth: October 1918 – 11 November 1918
 Albert Wilhelm Ferdinand Gröner, 1 November 1916 – 20 July 1917

Duty stations (airfields)
 Ensisheim: 16 October 1916 – 13 April 1917
 Habsheim: 13 April 1917 – 6 May 1917
 Château-Porcien: 7 May 1917 – 4 June 1917
 Spincourt: 6 June 1917 – 20 October 1917
 Erlon: 21 October 1917 – 23 November 1917
 Mercy-le-Haute: 24 November 1917 – 4 February 1918
 Aertrycke: 7 February 1918 – 14 March 1918
 Le Cateau: 15 March 1918 – 20 March 1918
 Foucaucourt: 21 March 1918 – 6 April 1918
 St. Marguerite: 13 April 1918 – October 1918
 Scheldewindeke: October 1918 – 11 November 1918

Notable personnel
 Ludwig Hanstein
 Karl Odebrett
 Otto Kissenberth
 Theodor Rumpel

Aircraft operated
 Fokker E.III
 Fokker E.IV
 Fokker D.I
 Fokker D.II
 Pfalz D.II
 Albatros D.III
 Albatros D.V
 Fokker Dr.I
 Fokker D.VII

References

Bibliography
 

16
Military units and formations established in 1916
1916 establishments in Germany
Military units and formations disestablished in 1918
Military units and formations of Bavaria